Fawkner Park is a popular park in Melbourne's South Yarra and part of the City of Melbourne. It provides recreational areas for teams playing Cricket, Softball, Soccer, Australian Rules Football, Tennis,Quadball and Rugby.

History and layout
The park was created in 1862, named after Melbourne co-founder John Pascoe Fawkner. It is trapezoidal in shape with an area of 41 hectares (101 acres), gently sloping towards a flat area, and was originally used for over seven different activities at one time, in sections specified for the purpose. It was also commonly used for walks and promenading. The layout of today remains similar to that of over 100 years ago, with pathways cutting through the park, edged with elm, oak and Moreton Bay Figs.

References

External links
 Fawkner Park Master Plan 2006
 Fawkner Park - City of Melbourne

Parks in Melbourne
1862 establishments in Australia
Protected areas established in 1862
City of Melbourne